The Jackie Robinson Story is a 1950 biographical film directed by Alfred E. Green (who had directed The Jolson Story, "one of the biggest hits of the 40s") and starring Jackie Robinson as himself. The film focuses on Robinson's struggle with the abuse of bigots as he becomes the first African-American Major League Baseball player of the modern era.

The film is among the list of films in the public domain in the United States.  However a new copyrighted "restored and in color" version was released in conjunction with the Jackie Robinson Foundation in 2008.

Plot

The film begins with Robinson as a boy. He is given a worn-out baseball glove by a stranger impressed by his fielding skills.  As a young man, he becomes a multi-sport star at UCLA, but as he nears graduation, he worries about his future. His older brother Mack was also an outstanding college athlete and graduate, but the only job he could get was that of a lowly street cleaner.

When America enters World War II, Robinson is drafted, serving as an athletic director. Afterward, he plays baseball with a professional African-American team. However, the constant travel keeps him away from his college sweetheart.

Then one day, Brooklyn Dodgers scout Clyde Sukeforth invites him to meet Branch Rickey, president of the Major League Baseball team. At first, Robinson considers the offer to be a practical joke, as African Americans are not allowed to play in the segregated major leagues. When he is convinced that the opportunity is genuine, he and Rickey size each other up. After thinking over Rickey's warning about the hatred and abuse he would have to endure without being able to strike back, Robinson signs with the Dodgers' International League farm team, the Montreal Royals. Though he wants to delay marrying Rae to shield her, she insists on an immediate wedding so she can support her man in the trying times ahead.

Robinson leads the league in hitting in his first year, and despite the grave concerns expressed by the Commissioner of Major League Baseball, Rickey goes ahead and promotes him to the Dodgers. Reviled at first by many of the fans and some of his own teammates, Robinson gets off to a shaky start, playing out of position at first base and going through a hitting slump, but then gradually wins people over with his talent and determination. The team goes on to win the pennant, with Robinson driving in the tying run and scoring the winning run in the deciding game.

Cast

Jackie Robinson as Himself
Ruby Dee as Rae Robinson
Minor Watson as Branch Rickey
Louise Beavers as Jackie's mother
Richard Lane as Clay Hopper
Harry Shannon as Frank Shaughnessy (listed as "Charlie" in the end credits)
Ben Lessy as Shorty
Bill Spaulding as Himself
Billy Wayne as Clyde Sukeforth
Joel Fluellen as Mack Robinson
Bernie Hamilton as Ernie
Kenny Washington as Tigers Manager
Pat Flaherty as Karpen
Larry McGrath as Umpire
Emmett Smith as Catcher
Howard Louis MacNeely as Jackie as a boy
George Dockstader as Bill
Dick Williams as the Jersey City Pitcher

Production
Principal photography for the film took place in the off-season following his third season with the Brooklyn Dodgers.  Much of the film was shot at Gilmore Field, home of the PCL Hollywood Stars.

Reception
Even during its initial release—in the era of racial segregation—the film received critical praise and fared well at the box office. The film was not as popular as originally thought but still profitable.

According to Bosley Crowther, "What is surprising... in this new film... is the sincerity of the dramatization and the integrity of Mr. Robinson playing himself. Too often, in films of this nature about sports figures, fanciful or real, the sentiments are inflated and the heroics glorified. Here the simple story of Mr. Robinson's trail-blazing career is re-enacted with manifest fidelity and conspicuous dramatic restraint. And Mr. Robinson, doing that rare thing of playing himself in the picture's leading role, displays a calm assurance and composure that might be envied by many a Hollywood star."

The film is recognized by American Film Institute in these lists:
 2006: AFI's 100 Years...100 Cheers – Nominated

Colorized version

On April 19, 2005, 20th Century Fox and Legend Films released a colorized version of the film, donating a portion of the proceeds to the Jackie Robinson Foundation, a charity that benefits education for gifted students. Another official version, as seen on Amazon Prime Video, remains in release by Metro-Goldwyn-Mayer (whose sister company, United Artists, produced this film).

See also
 42, a 2013 film also about Robinson
 List of United Artists films

References

External links 

 
 
 
 
 
 
 
 

1950 films
1950s biographical drama films
1950s sports films
American baseball films
Biographical films about sportspeople
American black-and-white films
Brooklyn Dodgers
Eagle-Lion Films films
1950s English-language films
Films about racism
Films directed by Alfred E. Green
Films scored by Herschel Burke Gilbert
Films set in the 1940s
Cultural depictions of Jackie Robinson
Sports films based on actual events
African-American biographical dramas
1950 drama films
1950s American films